Marvel Gymnasium was a 3,000-seat multipurpose gymnasium in Providence, Rhode Island.  It was home to the Brown University Bears basketball team as well as other teams.  The gymnasium included a basketball court and seating, a second-floor running track, squash and handball courts, a wrestling room, a boxing room, and a fencing room.

Description
The building was located at Aldrich Field, located on Elmgrove Avenue across from Brown Stadium.  The land for Aldrich Field was a gift to the University from brothers Charles and Henry Aldrich, both alumni of Brown.  The façade's clock face read "A-L-D-R-I-C-H-F-I-E-L-D" instead of the regular numbers, with the "R" being in place of the 12.  The bronze statue of "Bruno," the Brown bear mascot, was located just to the south of the main entrance on a pedestal containing a piece of slate said to have been from the spot where Roger Williams landed in what would become Providence in 1636. After Marvel Gym was closed, the statue was moved to the College Green, where it originally stood.

On October 7, 1938, the building was rededicated to the memory of Frederick W. "Doc" Marvel, class of 1896, a longtime athletic director.  The building was in use until 1989, when the Pizzitola Sports Center opened at the Brown Athletic Conference.  It was then closed and stood dormant until 2002, when it was demolished, well past its usefulness and becoming dangerously dilapidated.  There are now practice fields on the site. The building's cupola, mounted above a replica of the Aldrich Field clock, is now part of Brown's Nelson Fitness Center, which opened in May 2012.

References

External links
"Mavel Gymnasium" entry in Encyclopedia Brunoniana

Brown Bears men's basketball
Brown University buildings
Defunct indoor arenas in the United States
Indoor arenas in Rhode Island
College wrestling venues in the United States
Defunct college basketball venues in the United States
Sports venues in Rhode Island
1927 establishments in Rhode Island
Sports venues completed in 1927
1989 disestablishments in Rhode Island
Sports venues demolished in 2002
Basketball venues in Rhode Island
Squash venues in the United States
Fencing venues
Demolished sports venues in the United States